The 1981 French Open was a tennis tournament that took place on the outdoor clay courts at the Stade Roland Garros in Paris, France. The tournament ran from 25 May until 7 June. It was the 85th staging of the French Open, and the first Grand Slam tennis event of 1981.

Finals

Men's singles

 Björn Borg defeated  Ivan Lendl, 6–1, 4–6, 6–2, 3–6, 6–1 
It was Borg's 1st title of the year, and his 61st overall. It was his 11th (and last) career Grand Slam title, and his 6th French Open title (at that time, an Open Era record).

Women's singles

 Hana Mandlíková defeated  Sylvia Hanika, 6–2, 6–4 
It was Mandlíková's 2nd title of the year, and her 13th overall. It was her 2nd career Grand Slam title, and her 1st French Open title.

Men's doubles

 Heinz Günthardt /  Balázs Taróczy defeated  Terry Moor /  Eliot Teltscher, 6–2, 7–6, 6–3

Women's doubles

 Rosalyn Fairbank /  Tanya Harford defeated  Candy Reynolds /  Paula Smith, 6–1, 6–3

Mixed doubles

 Andrea Jaeger /  James Arias defeated  Betty Stöve /  Frederick McNair, 7–6, 6–4

Prize money

Total prize money for the event was FF3,365,445.

References

External links
 French Open official website

 
1981 Grand Prix (tennis)
1981 WTA Tour
1981 in French tennis
1981 in Paris